Private Lessons is a 1981 American sex comedy film starring Sylvia Kristel, Howard Hesseman, Eric Brown, and Ed Begley Jr.

The screenplay was written by Dan Greenburg, who wrote the original source novel, Philly. Greenburg appears as the manager of a motel in the film.

Private Lessons was one of Kristel's few major American film appearances; she was better known to European audiences for her Emmanuelle films which had only limited distribution in the United States. In early 2006, a 25th anniversary DVD release was issued in North America.

Plot 
Philip "Philly" Fillmore (Eric Brown) is an adventurous 15-year-old high school student and the son of a rich businessman in Albuquerque, who has left town on an extended trip during summer break, leaving the young man in the passing care of Nicole Mallow (Sylvia Kristel), a sexy French housekeeper and Lester Lewis (Howard Hesseman), the family's chauffeur.

The following day, Nicole approaches Philly while he is reading a magazine in the garden. She asks for recommendations for night time activities, and finding that all previous housekeepers have been elderly women, she teases Philly. Resenting her initially, Philly later becomes infatuated. When Nicole goes out shopping, Philly sneaks into her room and touches her bras and panties. He frequently uses his binoculars to observe her through the windows, deliberately walks by her when she is sunbathing beside the pool, and rides his bicycle past her room. When she finally spots him peeping into her room that night, she tells him to come inside and close her door. To Philly's utter shock, she intends him to close her door from the inside and watch her undress. She seductively strips her night dress, stockings and bra. However, it's too much for Philly when topless Nicole invites him to touch her breasts. When he frightfully objects, she steps back, throws the bra at him, then takes off her panties and offers them to him. When he sees her fully nude, he panics and leaves, but not before thanking her. He shares the story with his best friend Sherman.

Next morning, Nicole invites Philly to visit her at night after she finishes the dishes. After a game of tennis with Sherman, Philly looks for Nicole but doesn't find her in her room. While searching, he is surprised to find her in his father's bathtub. She requests him to rub her back and then invites him to remove his clothes and join her in the bathtub. At first he objects, but she keeps sweet-talking him until he finally gives in. However, he decides to wear swimming trunks. Once in the bathtub, she spoons and kisses his cheek and neck from behind before kissing him in the lips. When she tries to take off his swimming trunks, he insists that she turn off the lights first. She agrees, but once she touches his penis, he again panics and rushes out. She follows him to apologize, passionately kisses him good night and directly invites him to sleep with her, the sexual element of which he fails to comprehend. After flirting in a movie theater the following evening, they return home and kiss, but backs off when she reacts without fondness to the notion of marrying him. After a day's hiatus, the two reconcile and decide to go on a romantic date to a French restaurant where their love and lust blossoms. After kissing as usual while returning home in the car, they reach home and have sexual intercourse.

Nicole is revealed as an illegal alien; Lester is using this secret to blackmail her into helping him in a larger blackmail scheme against Philly. Lester intends that Nicole seduce Philly then fake her own death during sex. Lester would then 'help' the panicked Philly to secretly bury Nicole. Her body would later disappear, and a note would order Philly to steal $10,000 from his father to prevent exposure of his role in Nicole's "death".

When Nicole has second thoughts, Lester threatens to expose her as a child molester. Nicole has truly fallen in love with Philly, and she reveals the truth to him. Philly convinces his tennis coach (Ed Begley Jr.) to pose as a police detective and intimidate Lester with questions about Nicole's disappearance. Lester panics but is caught with the money before he can flee the country. Nicole and Philly return the money to the safe, but they decide not to expose Lester's treachery. In turn, he reluctantly decides not to expose Nicole's illegal alien status nor her acts of child molestation, knowing that Philly could easily expose his attempted embezzlement scheme to his father and the police, and as a result, he keeps his job.

Nicole fears that Philly's father will eventually discover their affair, and decides to leave. Before she does, she and Philly have passionate sexual intercourse one last time. Summer vacation ends and Philly returns to high school, thanks his teacher Miss Phipps for advising him to pursue girls whose age is more appropriate for him, and, in order to "discuss" this matter more closely, successfully asks her out to dinner. The film ends with Philly smiling.

Cast
 Sylvia Kristel as Nicole Mallow
 Howard Hesseman as Lester Lewis
 Eric Brown as Philip "Philly" Fillmore
 Patrick Piccininni as Sherman
 Ed Begley Jr. as Jack Travis
 Pamela Bryant as Joyce
 Meridith Baer as Miss Phipps
 Ron Foster as Mr. Fillmore
 Peter Elbling as Waiter
 Dan Barrows as Green
 Dan Greenburg as Hotel Owner
 Marian Gibson as Florence
 Judy Helden as Miss Kristel's Double

Music 
Songs featured in the film include:
 Air Supply: "Lost In Love"
 Eric Clapton: "Next Time You See Her"
 John Cougar: "I Need a Lover"
 Rod Stewart: "Hot Legs", "Tonight's The Night" and "You're in My Heart"
 Willie Nile: "That's the Reason"
 Randy VanWarmer: "Just When I Needed You Most"
 Earth, Wind and Fire: "Fantasy"

The soundtrack was released in the US by MCA Records and in Europe by WEA Records.

Production details 
Dan Greenburg wrote the film's screenplay, which he adapted from his own 1969 novel Philly. Producer R. Ben Efraim would produce a number of additional Private... movies over the next decade, including 1983's Private School (which features a brief appearance by Kristel), and two in-name-only sequels to Private Lessons in 1993 and 1994.

During the bedroom striptease, Judy Helden performed as the body double for Kristel.

The film was financed primarily by Jack Barry & Dan Enright Productions, even though its two chief producers, Jack Barry and Dan Enright, were better known for their game shows on television, of which Barry was the host and Enright the primary producer. The company's announcer at the time, Jay Stewart, provided the narration for one of the movie trailers for the film.

The film was also the first picture for Jensen Farley Pictures (a subsidiary of Sunn Classic Pictures), a movie studio founded by Rayland Jensen (founder of Sunn Classic Pictures) and his fellow employee, Clair Farley. Sunn, initially a subsidiary of the Schick razor company, would be sold to Taft Broadcasting in 1980, shortly before this film's release. Jensen Farley Pictures was created after the sale to Taft, and one of the company's early releases was a film produced by Taft, The Boogens, initially planned for release through Sunn. Jensen Farley would later release another sex comedy whose selling point was the promise of a young man coupled with an alluring older woman, Homework with Joan Collins.

Director Alan Myerson and the cinematographer he hired, Jan de Bont, shot their principal photography for the film in Arizona and New Mexico over the course of 6 weeks during the summer of 1980.

In 1985, the film was made in Italian as Il peccato di Lola (Lola's Sin) starring Donatella Damiani.

See also 
 The Graduate

References

External links
 
 
 

1981 films
1981 comedy films
1981 independent films
1980s coming-of-age comedy films
1980s sex comedy films
1980s teen comedy films
American coming-of-age comedy films
American independent films
American sex comedy films
American sexploitation films
American teen comedy films
1980s English-language films
Films about virginity
Films based on American novels
Films directed by Alan Myerson
Films set in New Mexico
Films shot in Arizona
Films shot in New Mexico
Teen sex comedy films
Teensploitation
1980s American films